John Tanguay (born April 3, 1998) is an American rower. He represented the United States at the 2020 Summer Paralympics.

Biography
He graduated from Columbia University in 2020 and won a silver medal at the 2019 World Rowing Championships.

A resident of Pennington, New Jersey, Tanguay attended Hopewell Valley Central High School.

References 

1998 births
Columbia Lions rowers
World Rowing Championships medalists for the United States
Living people
American male rowers
Hopewell Valley Central High School alumni
People from Pennington, New Jersey
Sportspeople from Mercer County, New Jersey
Columbia College (New York) alumni
Rowers at the 2020 Summer Paralympics
Medalists at the 2020 Summer Paralympics
Paralympic medalists in rowing
Paralympic silver medalists for the United States